The Rainbow World Tour was the fourth concert tour in 2000 by American singer-songwriter Mariah Carey, and supports her seventh studio album Rainbow (1999). The tour started in Europe on February 14, in Antwerp, Belgium, also an itinerary that included North America and ended on April 18, in Toronto. The tour's nine-date North American leg grossed $7.1 million according to Billboard.

Background 
The Rainbow Tour marked Carey's first tour in the U.S. in seven years since her 1993 Music Box Tour garnered a flurry of bad initial reviews. In addition to visiting more European countries, Carey also visited Singapore for the first time. During this tour, Carey debuted new songs from the Rainbow album such as: "Can't Take That Away (Mariah's Theme)", "Heartbreaker", "Thank God I Found You" and much more, including some of her biggest hits. Once again, longtime friend Trey Lorenz was featured as a backup singer. On tour merchandise shirts, a date in Dallas, Texas is listed, but was never actually scheduled.

Critical response 
The tour received generally mixed reviews, especially in the United States. Of the debut American performance at the Staples Center in Los Angeles, Variety said: "Mariah Carey's show begs for either simplicity or coherency." Of the United Center performance, and reflecting that this was the first time Mariah was scantily clad touring, The Chicago Sun-Times said that Carey had "been transformed from a wannabe Whitney to a wannabe Britney", and called her approach to concert performance "difficult to fathom" considering she was "the only artist to have scored a No. 1 hit in every year of the '90s, selling some 125 million records worldwide."

Set list 
The following set list is from the February 17 concert in Milan. It is not intended to represent all dates throughout the tour.

 "Mariah & Bianca" (Introduction) (contains elements of "Rainbow (Interlude)" and "Butterfly")
 "Emotions"
 "My All"
 "Dreamlover"
 "X-Girlfriend"
 "Vulnerability" (Video interlude)
 "Against All Odds (Take a Look At Me Now)"
 "Without You"
 "Make It Happen"
 "Thank God I Found You" (performed with Trey Lorenz) (contains elements of the Make It Last Remix)
 "Make You Happy" (Interlude) (performed by Trey Lorenz)
 "Fantasy" (Bad Boy Remix)
 "Always Be My Baby"
 "Crybaby"
 "Close My Eyes"
 "Petals"
 "Can't Take That Away (Mariah's Theme)"
 "Money Ain't a Thang" (Dance Interlude)
 "Heartbreaker" (contains elements of the Desert Storm Remix)
 "Honey" (contains elements of the Bad Boy Remix)
 "Vision of Love"
 "Rainbow" (Interlude)
 "Hero"
 "Butterfly Reprise" (Outro)

Shows

Notes

Personnel 
Randy Jackson – musical director
Eric Daniels – keyboards
Sam Sims - bass
Vernon Black – guitar
Gregory "Gigi" Gonoway – drums
Marquinho Brasil – percussion
Melonie Daniels – background vocals
Mary Ann Tatum – background vocals
Tracy Harris - background vocals
Lloyd Smith – background vocals
Trey Lorenz – vocals, background vocals

References 

Mariah Carey concert tours
2000 concert tours